Charles Conroy may refer to:

 Charles William Conroy (1868–1944), member of the Queensland Legislative Assembly